Pantha is a fictional character appearing in American comic books published by DC Comics.

Publication history
Pantha first appeared in New Titans #73 (February 1991) and was created by Marv Wolfman and Tom Grummett.

Fictional character biography
Pantha was a cat-like member of one of the incarnations of the Teen Titans. During her time with the Titans, she had no knowledge as to her origins, whether she was a woman or a female panther before the Wildebeest Society mutated her. But tragically, her ultimately fruitless search led her to many dead-ends. The significance of her designation as "X-24" was also never revealed.

While many of the other Titans were close friends, Pantha went out of her way to alienate herself from the team. Pantha was overtly hostile towards her teammates, often ridiculing and berating them. Despite her attitude, her feral abilities made her a valuable asset to the team.

To her initial frustration, Pantha was "adopted" as a surrogate mother by Baby Wildebeest. She did not like this at first, often making references to grisly ways the child could perish. She does work with him when need be, such as when the Titans helped in a counter-attack on murderous aliens in the Bloodlines crossover. She eventually takes responsibility for his care when she left the Titans with Red Star, forming a family.

Pantha and her teammates were almost stars of a children's cartoon series but the deal fell apart. She is part of a multi-hero effort to investigate and destroy alien parasites murdering people all across the planet.

Later, she teams up with her old allies when Cyborg, now with an entirely new level of power, threatens the entire Earth. The Justice League of America showed up also and a series of mistakes led to the entire team fighting. Pantha took on Catwoman but neither side won as they were interrupted by blasts from Orion. Baby Wildebeest himself was subdued by Superman.

During the "Infinite Crisis" storyline, she joins with another team of Titans, along with a new Doom Patrol and Justice Society of America. Their mission is to stop the deranged Superboy-Prime who has attacked this reality's version of Superboy. The battle originates at the town of Smallville, Kansas and moves to the outskirts of Keystone City. There, Pantha is killed with a backhand blow by Superboy-Prime that is so powerful that it knocks Ambush Bug unconscious. Superboy-Prime instantly claims he didn't mean to do it, but in the next few moments, he kills Baby Wildebeest and attacks Red Star with freezing breath. Red Star survives his injuries.

In Blackest Night: Titans crossover, Pantha was reanimated as a member of the Black Lanterns, ready to attack the Titans. However, her body is soon destroyed by a burst of white light emanating from Dawn Granger.

Powers and abilities
Pantha's human/panther physiology gave her superhuman strength, speed, and agility, as well as heightened senses (such as hearing, smelling, and night-vision), enhanced reflexes, and retractable claws on her hands and feet.

Other versions

Maxwell Lord's Domination
In an alternate timeline created by Booster Gold when he saved Blue Beetle from Maxwell Lord, Pantha, who is still alive in this timeline, is a member of Green Arrow and Hawkman's Freedom Fighters. In this timeline, Lord had used his resources to conquer most of Earth. While Superboy-Prime does eventually visit, Pantha is not there to face him and thus die. It was revealed that Pantha was a vet student at New York University named Rosabelle Mendez who was captured by Maxwell Lord and made into Pantha, then sold to the Wildebeest Society. This timeline is neutralized when Blue Beetle willingly returns to the past to face his fate.

In other media
 Pantha appears in Teen Titans, voiced by Diane Delano. This version is a professional wrestler, luchador, and associate of Wildebeest who possesses superhuman strength and can execute a clawhold she calls the "Pantha's Claw". In the episode "Calling All Titans", Cyborg makes her an honorary member of the Teen Titans, but is later attacked by Brotherhood of Evil members Adonis and Atlas. After defeating them off-screen by the episode "Titans Together", Pantha locates a Titans safehouse and joins forces with Beast Boy, Más, Herald, and Jericho to infiltrate the Brotherhood's headquarters and rescue the captive Titans before defeating the Brotherhood.
 Pantha appears in issue #32 of Teen Titans Go!.

References

External links
 Pantha at DC Wiki
 Pantha at Comic Vine
 DCU Guide: Pantha

Characters created by Marv Wolfman
Comics characters introduced in 1991
DC Comics female superheroes
DC Comics metahumans
Fictional characters with superhuman senses
DC Comics characters with superhuman strength
Fictional werecats
Fictional wrestlers